Jassy may refer to:
 Iași, a city in north-eastern Romania, former capital of the Principality of Moldavia

History
 Treaty of Jassy, a pact between Russian Empire and Ottoman Empire ending the Russo-Turkish War (1787–1792)
 First Jassy–Kishinev Offensive and Second Jassy–Kishinev Offensive, two 1944 World War II major offensives

People
 Jassy (surname), several people
 Jasz people, an ethnic group in Hungary, of Ossetic origin

Culture
 Adath Jeshurun of Jassy Synagogue, a defunct synagogue
 Jassy, a novel by Norah Lofts
 Jassy (film), a 1947 British film melodrama adaptation of the novel

See also
 Iasi (disambiguation)
 Yassy (disambiguation)